Brian Dabul (born 24 February 1984) is an Argentine retired tennis player. He was ranked the No. 1 junior in the world in January 2002.  His highest ranking in men's singles was No. 82 (9 March 2009), and his highest ranking in doubles was No. 79 (11 January 2010).

Early life
Dabul was born in Buenos Aires, Argentina, to parents Jorge and Nora, and is Jewish.

Tennis career

Juniors
Dabul was an outstanding junior, reaching No. 1 in the world in January 2002 (and No. 5 in doubles).

Professional career

2003–07
Dabul's climb in the professional ranks was a slow one, not indicative of his status as a former No. 1 Junior player. He broke into the top-500 in 2003, the top-300 in 2004, but did not crack the top-200 until late in 2007, finishing that year ranked No. 159.

2008–10
Dabul continued his slow, steady rise in 2008. In March, he reached his career-high in doubles of #88 with some good Challenger results, and then followed that up with a singles Challenger win in San Luis Potosí to reach a career-high in singles of No. 133. Three semi-final appearances in his next 4 Challengers got his ranking to No. 114 by May, but he failed to qualify into the 2008 French Open. He won the 2009 Chilean Open men's doubles championship with Pablo Cuevas.

Dabul reached the third round of the 2010 Indian Wells Masters, defeating No. 16 seed Gilles Simon en route and losing to eventual champion Ivan Ljubicic.

Retirement
Dabul announced his retirement in 2012 due to an injury to his back.

ATP career finals

Doubles: 1 (1–0)

See also
 List of select Jewish tennis players

References

External links
 
 

1984 births
Living people
Argentine Jews
Argentine male tennis players
Jewish Argentine sportspeople
Jewish tennis players
Tennis players from Buenos Aires
Tennis players at the 2003 Pan American Games
Pan American Games competitors for Argentina